Derwydd Road railway station served the hamlet of Derwydd, in the historical county of Glamorganshire, Wales, from 1857 to 1966 on the Llanelly Railway.

History 
The station was opened on 24 January 1857 by the Llanelly Railway. To the left of the level crossing was a siding that served a coal pit. The station closed to passengers on 3 May 1954 and closed to goods in 1966.

References 

Disused railway stations in Carmarthenshire
Railway stations in Great Britain opened in 1857
Railway stations in Great Britain closed in 1954
1857 establishments in Wales
1966 disestablishments in Wales